Imamia Students Organization is the Shiite Muslim students' organization in Pakistan. It was founded by Ayat ullah Syed Murtaza Hussain Sadar ul Fazil, Molana Agha Ali Moosvi, Molana Safdar Hussain Najafi, Dr Muhammad Ali Naqvi on 22 May 1972 at University of Engineering and Technology, Lahore. In 2013, it had "around 2500 units in Pakistan" located in Pakistan, Federally Administered Tribal Areas, Azad Kashmir, and Gilgit-Baltistan.

Links to Iran
Ground reality is that the ISO is funded by students through their own pocket money, and that the organisation only receives moral guidance from Iran.

Goals
ISO is Working to eliminate the non-Islamic elements and secularism from the curriculum and teachings of the educational institutions of Pakistan. The ISO has attempted to spread the message of unity among Muslims at all levels and help poor students who cannot bear the expense of education.

See also 
 Majlis Wahdat-e-Muslimeen
 Shia Ulema Council
 Tehrik-e-Jafaria

References

External links
 

1972 establishments in Pakistan
Shia Islam in Pakistan
Shia organizations
Student organizations established in 1972
Student religious organisations in Pakistan
Student societies in Pakistan